Ronald Fox may refer to:

 Ronald Fox (cricketer)
Ronald E. Fox, a former president of the American Psychological Association
 A victim of the Our Lady of the Angels School Fire who died in Room 211